Robert “Bob” Dugard (3 July 1942 – 5 August 2018) was an English motorcycle speedway rider and promoter.

After retiring from racing, Bob Dugard joined Danny Dunton in a new company – Oxspeed Ltd – as co-promoter of Oxford Rebels at Sandy Lane, losing the name Oxford Cheetahs. Another director of the company was the jazz musician Acker Bilk. Bob Dugard and Danny Dunton promoted speedway at Oxford until the stadium was under threat from development and they first sought a new location at Harringay before settling at White City. For a long time associated with Eastbourne Eagles, he was active for many years – reputed as being happiest on the tractor and grading the track between races, yet still involved with the management and working alongside his son Martin Dugard and other family members. He was the owner of Arlington Stadium and away from the track he was a successful businessman as a director of Machine Tools in Hove. In later years he underwent heart surgery and was diagnosed with cancer. Bob is survived by his wife Margaret, three children, a step daughter and eight grandchildren.

References

1942 births
2018 deaths
British motorcycle racers
British speedway riders
Wimbledon Dons riders
Oxford Cheetahs riders
Ipswich Witches riders
West Ham Hammers riders
Eastbourne Eagles riders
Speedway promoters
People from Hove